Hafthar (also Romanized as Haft Har; also known as Haftdar and Hūnū Marvar) is a village in Surk Rural District of Bafruiyeh District of Meybod County, Yazd province, Iran. At the 2006 National Census, its population was 288 in 107 households. The following census in 2011 counted 318 people in 111 households. The latest census in 2016 showed a population of 256 people in 99 households; it was the largest village in its rural district.

References 

Meybod County

Populated places in Yazd Province

Populated places in Meybod County